The IWBF Champions League, formerly IWBF Champions Cup, is the top European competition in wheelchair basketball clubs in mens.

Events
Since 2009, the European club competitions work as this:

Eurocup 1: IWBF Champions League
Eurocup 2: André Vergauwen Cup
Eurocup 3: Willi Brinkmann Cup
Eurocup 4: IWBF Challenge Cup

Results

Titles by club

Titles by country

Medals (1975-2022)

See also 
Wheelchair basketball
European Wheelchair Basketball Championship
André Vergauwen Cup
Willi Brinkmann Cup
IWBF Challenge Cup
Kitakyushu Champions Cup

Links 
https://fr.wikipedia.org/wiki/Coupe_d%27Europe_des_clubs_de_basket-ball_en_fauteuil_roulant

https://fr.wikipedia.org/wiki/Championnats_d%27Europe_de_basket-ball_en_fauteuil_roulant?tableofcontents=1

References

Wheelchair basketball competitions in Europe
1976 establishments in Europe